Rafał Ruta (born 24 October 1974) is a former Polish footballer who played as a midfielder.

Biography
Born in Wieluń, Ruta started his career playing with local IV liga side Motor Praszka. After 6 months into his professional career Ruta secured himself a move to I liga side Stal Mielec. Despite failing to make an appearance in his first 6 months at the club, he soon became an important player for Stal over the next few years. He made his Stal and I liga debut on 26 August 1989, playing in a 1–0 win against ŁKS Łódź. For a total 7 seasons Ruta was a consistent started for Stal, playing in 177 I liga games and scoring 8 goals during this time.

In January 1996 Ruta joined fellow I liga team Olimpia-Lechia Gdańsk, making his debut against Stomil Olsztyn on 24 March 1996. Ruta made a total of 15 appearances and scored 1 goal during the 6 months he was a player for Olimpia-Lechia, with the team struggling during this time and with Olimpia-Lechia eventually suffering relegation at the end of the season. After Olimpia-Lechia's relegation leading to the club being dissolved, Ruta joined 10 other former Olimpia-Lechia players in joining Polonia Warsaw for the upcoming season. In his first season with Polonia he made 20 appearances in the I liga, before his influence in the first team decreased making a further 15 appearances combined over the following 2 seasons.

After his 3 seasons in the Polish capital, Ruta joined II liga side Ceramika Opoczno for the 1999–2000 season. He made an impressive 35 appearances and scored 3 goals for Ceramika during his one season with the club. Ruta returned to the I liga with Odra Wodzisław for the following season, playing 27 times and scoring a single goal with Odra. Ruta then returned to Polonia Warsaw, but managed to only make 2 appearances during the season, eventually finding himself playing for the Polonia II team for the second half of the season. After his disappointing return to Polonia Ruta joined Świt Nowy Dwór Mazowiecki. He had an impressive season with Świt, playing 27 times and scoring 5 goals for the club. At the end of the season Świt were involved in a promotion play-off with Szczakowianka Jaworzno. Świt won 1–0, but the result was investigated for match fixing, with the final outcome including the lifetime bans of footballing activities in Poland for 6 players, one of which being Ruta. Due to the lifetime ban in his home country, Ruta moved to the United States playing for Polonia Mielec Chicago SC over the following 4 seasons before finally retiring from playing.

References

1974 births
Stal Mielec players
Lechia Gdańsk players
Polonia Warsaw players
Ceramika Opoczno players
Odra Wodzisław Śląski players
Świt Nowy Dwór Mazowiecki players
Polish footballers
Association football midfielders
Living people